The Damor are an ethnic community found indigenous to the current state of Gujarat in India. They are also known as Damaria.

Origin 

The Damor form a section of the Bhil tribe. The Damor are found in the districts of Sabarkantha, Dahod and Panchmahal. They speak the bhili dialect of Rajasthani, although many also speak Gujarati.

Present circumstances 

The Damor are an endogamous community and practice clan exogamy. Their main clans are the Parmar, Sisodia, Rathore, Chauhan, Solanki, Saradia and Karadiya. Most of these are also well known parallel Rajput clans. The Damor are mainly settled agriculturists, and include both landowners and sharecroppers.

, the Damor of Rajasthan were classified as a Scheduled Tribe under the Indian government's reservation program of positive discrimination.

References

Bhil
Tribal communities of Gujarat
Scheduled Tribes of Rajasthan